Joseph Kleitsch (June 6, 1882 – November 16, 1931) was a Hungarian-American portrait and plein air painter who holds a high place in the early California School of Impressionism.

Biography 
Born in the village of Sânmihaiu Român, old Hungarian province of Banat, now in Romania, on June 6, 1882, Kleitsch, an ethnic German, began painting at the age of seven. He later pursued art training in Budapest, Munich and Paris. He immigrated to the United States in 1912 and two years later, on July 22, 1914, he married Edna Gregatis of Chicago, Illinois with whom he would have his only child, Eugene. Influenced by his visits to the famous museums of Europe, Kleitsch continued with his love of portrait and figurative painting after relocating to California. There he rose to the challenge of capturing his new environment's brilliant light and diverse landscape. Kleitsch fell in love with the rustic artist village of Laguna Beach, moving there in 1920. Notable works depicted the town's eucalyptus lined streets, the crashing waves of the Pacific coastline and the nearby Mission San Juan Capistrano. Kleitsch became a significant resident of the Laguna Beach Artists Colony. Arthur Millier of the Los Angeles Times in 1922 was quoted saying of Kleitsch "he was a born colorist; he seemed to play on canvas with the abandon of a gypsy violinist". On November 16, 1931, at the age of forty-nine, Kleitsch died of a heart attack in front of the courthouse in Santa Ana, California. Two years after his death, Kleitsch's widow opened the Joseph Kleitsch Fine Arts Gallery in Laguna Beach.

Professional Memberships 

 Chicago Society of Artists
Laguna Beach Art Association
Painters' & Sculptors' Club
Palette & Chisel Club of Chicago.

Galleries and Museums 
Joseph Kleitsch Fine Art, Beverly Hills
Irvine Museum, Irvine California,
Crocker Art Museum, Sacramento, California,
Pasadena Museum of California Art, Pasadena, California,
Bowers Museum, Santa Ana, California,
Fleischer Museum, Scottsdale, Arizona,
Laguna Art Museum
William A. Karges Fine Art

Awards 

Gold Medal, Art Institute of Chicago 1914;
Silver Medal, Painters' and Sculptors' Club;
Grand Prize & Figure Prize, Laguna Beach Art Association

References

Further reading

Literature: Plein Air Painters of the Southland, by Ruth Lily Westphal, 1996;
Literature: Artists in California, 1786-1940, by Edan Milton Hughes, 1989.

20th-century American painters
American male painters
American Impressionist painters
Painters from California
1882 births
1931 deaths
Modern painters
20th-century American male artists
Austro-Hungarian emigrants to the United States